Martine Veldhuis (born 12 December 1996) is a Dutch rower. She won the gold medal in the women's lightweight single sculls event at the 2020 European Rowing Championships held in Poznań, Poland. This was the first time the Netherlands won this event at the European Rowing Championships.

In 2018, she competed in the women's lightweight single sculls event at the World Rowing Championships held in Plovdiv, Bulgaria. The following year, she competed in the same event at the 2019 World Rowing Championships held in Ottensheim, Austria.

References

External links 
 

Living people
1996 births
Place of birth missing (living people)
Dutch female rowers
European Rowing Championships medalists
World Rowing Championships medalists for the Netherlands
21st-century Dutch women